Flower thrips can be agricultural pests in either two species of thrips in the genus Frankliniella:

 F. tritici, Eastern flower thrips
 F. occidentalis, Western flower thrips